Nicholas Brown is an Australian actor, screenwriter, playwright, singer and songwriter.

Personal life 
Brown grew up in the Western Sydney suburb of Greystanes with parents Roy and Patricia Brown and older sister Tracey. He attended Newtown High School of the Performing Arts in years 11 and 12. Whilst at NHSPA he represented the school in various drama and music festivals including OnStage and was elected School Captain in 1997.

In 1998 Brown was accepted into the prestigious Australian drama school the National Institute of Dramatic Art and was said to be both one of the youngest students and the first student to be accepted directly from high school.

In 2007 Brown moved from Sydney to Mumbai where he lived on and off until 2015. He appeared in several Bollywood films including Kites, Love You To Death, Unindian, Prattichaya and Sedition.

In 2011 Brown lived in Los Angeles where he recorded and performed with the funk bands Knuckle Funk and Luck Now.

In 2010 Brown was a Cleo Bachelor of the Year nominee.

Acting career 

On stage in 2022 Brown played Edmond Rostand opposite Angie Milliken in Queensland Theatre's production of Bernhardt/Hamlet. On screen he played the role of Chubba in Tim Minchin's Upright Season 2, Hamish in the Netflix film A Perfect Pairing, Paul in Channel 9's drama series After The Verdict and Rahul in Joe VS Carole. In 2021 he played the role of Miles in the Stan film Christmas On The Farm, appeared in the drama series Wakefield and played Sigrid Thorton's love interest Dr. Omar Sebastian in the Channel 9 drama series Amazing Grace. From 2019 to 2020 Brown appeared in the smash hit stage musical Come From Away as Kevin J at the Comedy Theatre in Melbourne. From 2015 to 2019, Brown appeared in the TV shows The Unlisted for Netflix, Harrow, The Letdown and The Code 2. He played the lead role of Sid in the film Laka and was cast as a regular presenter on Play School. From 2016 to 2019 Brown appeared in the plays Lighten Up at Griffin Theatre in Sydney, Still Point Turning for Sydney Theatre Company, The Long Forgotten Dream (Sydney Theatre Company) and the Helpmann Award-winning play Counting And Cracking at Belvoir for Sydney Festival. In 2015 Brown played the role of Jesus in Jesus Christ Superstar directed by Alyque Padamsee in Mumbai. He also played Lumiere in Disney India's Beauty And The Beast which toured to Mumbai and Delhi. Earlier TV credits include Mr and Mrs Murder, Packed to the Rafters and the real life heroin drug smuggler Supahaus Chowdury in the Australian television show Underbelly: The Man Who Got Away.  Brown has also appeared in the cop series City Homicide, Anh Do's Channel 7 comedy pilot Lucky Dragon, and Australian feature films The Characters, Temptation and A Man's Gotta Do. His other television credits include Home and Away, White Collar Blue, Heartbreak High, Drama School and The Cooks.

Acting in many international theatre festivals, in 2010 Brown performed in three new plays at the Australian National Play Festival in Brisbane, in Rehaan Engineer's ‘Seven Jewish Children’ by Caryl Churchill, Project 88 Art Gallery in Mumbai and 'Doctrine: How To Survive Under Siege' in Brussels, Belgium, for the Kunsten Festival Des Arts. Brown also represented the NIDA company at the UNESCO 2007 drama schools festival in Transylvania Romania, playing Orestes in Aeschylus's Ancient Greek tragedy 'The Oresteian Trilogy.'

Shortly after moving to Mumbai in 2007, Brown was cast as the villain Tony Grover opposite Bollywood superstar Hrithik Roshan in the film Kites, directed by Anurag Basu and produced by Rakesh Roshan. The film was re-cut for an English audience by Brett Ratner and was released worldwide as Kites The Remix. Kites was released worldwide in May 2010. Brown was typecast as the villain in India for several years playing the negative role in the film Unindian opposite Brett Lee and the villain Nikhil Madhvani opposite Shilpa Shetty in Miss Bollywood, which toured Germany and the UK including London's West End. Other theatre credits include There Is No Need To Wake Up at the Sydney Opera House directed by Barrie Kosky; Kurt Weill's Berlin to Broadway, directed by Jim Sharman; Spunks at the Stables Theatre; Frozen for Company B Belvoir St Theatre, directed by Kate Gaul; Toad in the Australian Shakespeare Company's productions of Wind in the Willows, and Martin Crimp's Fewer Emergencies at The Old Fitzroy Theatre and 2005 Hi-5 Space Magic – World Tour.

In May 2021, Brown played Petruchio in William Shakespeare's The taming of the shrew with Queensland Theatre (in the Bille Brown Theatre, Brisbane), directed by Damien Ryan.

Writer 
Nicholas wrote episode 12 of the Netflix/ ABC Me series The Unlisted, and episode 16 of the ABC Kids TV show The Wonder Gang. He co-wrote his first play Lighten Up, which premiered at Sydney's Griffin Theatre. Lighten Up was published by Currency Press, and a monologue from the play was included in the 2016 edition of the book Contemporary Australian Monologues for Men.

He co-wrote the play Lost In Books, which was part of Sydney Festival, and True West for the National Theatre of Parramatta. Brown's play Sex Magick has been in development with Griffin Theatre since 2020.

Brown did some production work on an Indo-Australian Bollywood film in 2010, with Olivia Newton-John.

Music 
Brown was the lead singer of the LA based funk band Knuckle Funk in 2011–2012. The group became a duo a few years later and released two singles renaming themselves Luck Now. The first single 'I Spent My Rent On A Record' was released in 2015 and was co-written by Brown. It received regular airplay on MTV Indies and VH1 in India. He also co-wrote and recorded lead vocals for the song Unpredictable (The Robot Song) in 2013. As a singer/songwriter, Brown also recorded the album 'Big Score' in 2005 with his Australian disco funk band The Modernists  in 2004 and performed at Australian venues such as The Basement and The Metro. The album received radio airplay on Sydney radio stations FBI and 2SER.

In 2005 he was the male understudy for the children's internationally recognised pop group Hi-5 on their world tour.

Brown was also invited to sing at ‘Raise the Roof’ at Sydney's State Theatre in a special concert to raise funds for the Tsunami Appeal in 2006. In 2007 before moving to Mumbai, Nick wrote and recorded an unreleased album with the electro rock duo ‘Listen Like Thieves.’

Radio presenter 
From 2012 to 2014 Brown was hosting SBS Radio's PopDesi – a radio programme for Bollywood, Bhangra and Desi pop music playing on Australian digital radio, online and mobile

Awards 
In 2004 Brown was a recipient of The Mike Walsh Fellowship.

Community work 
His charity work includes:
 2013 – Performed at the 'National Asbestos Awareness Day Lighting the Sails' of the Sydney Opera House event in memory of the victims of asbestos related disease.
 2012 – Supporting the work of the National Youth Theatre Company Foundation  as an ambassador and through facilitating youth welfare programs.
 2010 – The official male Ambassador for Ovarian Cancer Australia's 2010 Ovarian Cancer Awareness Month campaign  
 2006 – Raise The Roof – Tsunami Appeal special appearance for the Red Cross
 2005 – Royal Prince Alfred Hospital Foundation – official MC and voice of the RPA Foundation Research Prize
 2004 – Royal Prince Alfred Hospital – RPA Health Festival volunteer and special guest
 2003 – Music For Timor – Master of Ceremonies and performer at Music benefit concert to support the work of the Bairo Pite Clinic

Credits

Screen

Stage

References

Living people
Male actors from Sydney
Australian songwriters
Australian screenwriters
Australian radio presenters
21st-century Australian singers
21st-century Australian male singers
Year of birth missing (living people)